is a fashion and music event held on October 8, 2016, at Yoyogi National Gymnasium 1st Gymnasium in Tokyo, Japan. The main MCs were Minami Takahashi, Ryōta Yamasato and Yurika Mita. In this event, Nogizaka46 made their 8th appearance and became the most participants. The event was partially streamed on Line Live.

Models 

 Chiemi Aikou, Aya Asahina, Nanami Abe, Mayuko Arisue, Niko Andō, Erika Ikuta (Nogizaka46), Elaiza Ikeda, Miyū Ikeda, Nicole Ishida, Nina Itō, Marika Itō (Nogizaka46), Asuka Eiki, Amy, Shiori Enatsu, emma, Emma Jasmine, Eri Ōishi, Mitsuki Oishi, Ai Okawa, Yui Okada, Nanaka Ozawa (X21), Yurano Ochi, Saya Kagawa, Miwako Kakei, Nana Katō, CAROLINA, Mayuko Kawakita, Hinako Kitano (Nogizaka46), Runa Kuwata, Yui Kobayashi (Keyakizaka46), Chihiro Kondō, Asuka Saitō  (Nogizaka46), Rikako Sakata, Noa Sakuma, Yui Sakuma, Arisa Sato, Hinako Sano, Monica Sahara, Sara, Yuki Shikanuma, Mai Shiraishi (Nogizaka46), Shū Takada, Karen Takizawa, Eri Tachibana, Mei Tanaka, Kaho Tanabe, Misaki Tanabe, Maria Tani, Tina Tamashiro, Akemi Darenogare, Misato Tsuboi, Tokico, Natsue Tokumoto, Reina Triendl, Minori Nakada, An Nakamura, Nanao, Tomoko Nozaki, Moeka Nozaki, Nanami Hashimoto (Nogizaka46), Mizuho Habu (Keyakizaka46), Yorika Hamada, Miyu Hayashida, Yurina Hirate, Nicole Fujita, Akane Hotta, Honoka, Miona Hori (Nogizaka46), Maggy, Airi Matsui, Nanaka Matsukawa, Sayuri Matsumura (Nogizaka46), Reina Mama, Juliana Minato, Azusa Minamiyama, Risa Miyauchi, Mai Miyagi, Miyu, Yōko Melody, Momona, Hikari Mori, Alissa Yagi, Saaya Yamasaki (X21), Hirona Yamazaki, Nairu Yamamoto, Raika Yumi, Chisato Yoshiki, Loveli, Reina Yoshida, Risa Watanabe (Keyakizaka46)
 Non-no models: Yuko Araki, Niina Endō, Sayaka Okada, Azusa Okamoto, Anri Okamoto, Mana Kinjō, Akiko Kuji, Eri Satō, Mina Sayado, Yua Shinkawa, Yūka Suzuki, Yūna Suzuki, Riho Takada, Rena Takeda, Nanase Nishino (Nogizaka46), Fumika Baba
 Seventeen models: Suzu Hirose, Ayaka Miyoshi, Manami Enosawa, Marie Iitoyo, Seika Furuhata, Natsumi Okamoto, Miki Shimomura, Karen Ōtomo, Mayū Yokota, Momoko Tanabe, Aya Marsh, Mai Suenaga, Asuka Kawazu

Artists 
 Keyakizaka46, G=AGE, JINTAKA, SUPER★DRAGON, DOBERMAN INFINITY, Kana Nishino, Nogizaka46, M!LK, Rei Yasuda, Leola, ARCADIA, Carat, Chise Kanna, Makomina

Brands 
 Ank Rouge, Bershka, EVRIS, FOREVER 21, FOUR SIS&CO., GUILD PRIME, KIMONO PRINCESS, LIP SERVICE, LOVELESS, OLIVE des OLIVE, one spo, one way, SAC'S BAR, Samantha Thavasa, SPINNS, Stradivarius, Ungrid, WEGO

References

External links 
 

Fashion events in Japan
Japanese fashion
Japanese subcultures
Events in Tokyo
Annual events in Japan
Semiannual events
2016 awards
October 2016 events in Japan